Hunting Flies can refer to:

 Hunting Flies (1969 film), a 1969 Polish film
 Hunting Flies (2016 film), a 2016 Norwegian film